Høgevarde or Høgevard   is the second highest peak (1459 m) on the Norefjell  mountain range and the highest point in the municipality of Krødsherad in Buskerud, Norway. It is  known for its vast view (estimated 40,000 km²) over eastern Norway. At the top there is an iron plate giving names and directions to mountains along the horizon. About 100 meters below the peak is Høgevardehytta, a self-service cabin maintained by the DNT (Den Norske Turistforening).

References

Mountains of Viken